Vellamunda  is a grama panchayat in the Wayanad district of the state of Kerala, India, situated approximately 15 km away from Mananthavady, the nearest town. Vellamunda Panchayath Office is situated at Ettenalu (Literally translated to 8/4, which signifies that this place is located at a distance of 8 miles and 4 furlongs from Mananthavady).

Etymology 
The name Vellamunda is derived from 'Vellamunda Idam', which was the Tharavad of Vattathod family, the landlords of these areas in the days of Jenmi rule. The places near Vellamunda are Pazhajana, Thettamala and others. There is a small hospital and a u.p school.

History 
The areas that constitute the present-day Vellamunda were ruled by the Puliya Kingdom before the days of Pazhassi Raja. The Puliyan Nair clan (Polighar), which inherited control of these areas, were not very popular among the commons. This led to unrests from the Naduvazhis (Lords) of sub-divisions of the place, namely,  Mangalassery, Vattathod, Cherukara, Karingari, and Tharuvana, who approached Pazhassi Raja with a request to overthrow the Puliya Clan. Pazhassi duly obliged and defeated them, subsequently adding the area to The Kingdom of Kottayam.

It is believed that Mangalassery Hills served as one of the bases for his guerilla warfare against the British.

In 1950, Chondarnad (Present-day Thondarnad) and Vellamunda villages were merged to form Vellamunda Grama Panchayat, which was reorganized in 1961 by removing Thondarnad and adding Porunnannur.

Location and Connectivity 
Vellamunda is located on the Mananthavady-Kuttiyady route, and is well connected to nearby towns by roads. Kozhikode (83 km away) is accessible via the Kuttiyady Churam while the district capital Kalpetta, which is at a distance of approximately 30 km, can be reached via Padinjarathara.

Demographics 
Vellamunda, similar to other areas in Wayanad, is a not-so-densely populated village. The salient features  from the 2011 India Census data are given below.

Administration 
The Vellamunda grama panchayat is governed as per the Panchayati Raj act and is administrated by the democratically elected Village Head (Panchayat President) and the council of elected Panchayat members. P. K. Ahmed Haji served as the first President after the panchayat was reorganized in 1961. P. Thankamani of the Indian Union Muslim League, whose term started in 2015, is the incumbent Panchayat President. The details of the council of members are as follows.

See also 
 Mananthavady 
 Thondernad
 Nalloornad
Payyampally
Thavinjal
Vimalanager
Anjukunnu
Panamaram
Tharuvana
Kallody
Oorpally
Valat
Thrissilery

References 

Villages in Wayanad district